Sadāparibhūta Bodhisattva, Never Disparaging Bodhisattva, (Ch: 常不輕菩薩 cháng bù qīng púsà; Jp: Jōfukyō Bosatsu) appears in Lotus Sutra Chapter 20 which describes the practices of Bodhisattva Never Disparaging, who lived in the Middle Period of the Law (Ch: 像法 xiàng fă) of the Buddha  Awesome Sound King (Ch: 威音王如來 Wēi yīn wáng rúlái). He persevered in the face of persecution for the sake of the correct teaching, and finally attained Buddhahood. Bodhisattva Never Disparaging was Shakyamuni Buddha in one of his past lifetimes.

Etymology
The name of Sadāparibhūta is thought to mean never despising (Skt. sadā-aparibhūta: always, not despising). However it can also be translated as sadā-paribhūta: always despised. 
According to Hurvitz, "It is possible that the name is a false sankritization of a Prakrit form going back to sadāparibhavitā, nom. s. of sadāparibhavitr, hence ever disgracing or never disgracing, of which, of course, the former is not possible." Anesaki attributes this more popular choice of translation to Kumārajīva.

The story of Sadāparibhūta 
In chapter 20 of the Lotus Sutra, Shakyamuni Buddha explains that those who despise or abuse the followers of the Lotus Sutra's teaching, will have to face negative karmic consequences. People who preserve the Lotus teaching will however be able to purify their faculty of the eye, ear, nose, tongue, body, and mind. In order to explain this again, the Buddha tells a story about a previous life (avadana) when he was a Bodhisattva called Sadāparibhūta.
Sadāparibhūta did not study or explain sutras but he paid homage to all Buddhist monks, nuns or lay followers he met and predicted that they all would become Buddhas. Some Buddhists questioned Sadāparibhūta's authority to make such a prediction of future Buddhahood and got angry. When they attacked him with sticks or stones he shouted from a distance, "I do not despise you. You are not despised, for you all perform bodhisattva practice and you are to become buddhas." Before he died he heard the Lotus Sutra and was able to purify the six senses. After an inconceivable number of rebirths he had accumulated great merit and attained the perfect enlightenment of a Buddha.

See also 
 Mahayana
 Nichiren Buddhism
 Tiantai

Notes

References

Sources 
 
 
     
 Hurvitz, Leon (1971-1972). The Lotus Sutra in East Asia: A Review of Hokke Shiso, Monumenta Serica 29, 697-762 
 Kanno, Hiroshi (2002). The Practice of Bodhisattva Never Disparaging in the Lotus Sutra and its Reception in China and Japan, Journal of Oriental Philosophy 12, 104-122 

 
 Lopez, Donald S.; Stone,Jacqueline I. (2019). Two Buddhas Seated Side by Side: A Guide to the Lotus Sūtra, Princeton University Press
   
 
 Watson, Burton (tr.).  The Lotus Sutra and Its Opening and Closing Chapters. Tokyo: Soka Gakkai 2009.

Bibliography
 Murano, Senchu (1967). An Outline of the Lotus Sūtra, Contemporary Religions in Japan 8/1, 61-63
 Shinjo Suguro, Nichiren Buddhist International Center, trans. (1998): Introduction to the Lotus Sutra, Fremont, Calif.: Jain Publishing Company.

External links
Sadāparibhūta, translated from Sanskrit by Hendrik Kern 

Bodhisattvas
Nichiren Buddhism